Khalaf-e Mosallam (also known as Khalaf Moslem and Ka‘be Khalaf Moslem) is a village in Hoseynabad Rural District, in the Central District of Shush County, Khuzestan Province, Iran. At the 2006 census, its population was 1,658, in 209 families.

References 

Populated places in Shush County